Kroger is a German surname, a variant of Krüger or a spelling of Kröger without diacritics. Notabel people with the surname include:
 Bernard Kroger (1860–1938), American businessman who created the Kroger chain of supermarkets
 Chris Kroger (born 1968), American ski mountaineer
 Harry Kroger, American physicist and electrical engineer
 Helen Kroger (born 1959), former Australian politician
 Lona Cohen (1913–1992), Soviet spy known by the alias Helen Kroger
 Henry Kroger (1906–1987), Australian cricketer
 Jacob Kroger (died 1594), German goldsmith working for Anne of Denmark
 John Kroger (born 1966), Oregon politician
 Kroger Babb (1906–1980), American film and television producer
 Max Kroger (1899–1989), Australian rules footballer
 Michael Kroger (born 1957), businessman and a powerbroker within the Victorian division of the Liberal Party of Australia
 Mike Kroger (born 1951), American former politician
 Morris Cohen (spy) (1910–1995), known by the alias Peter Kroger
 William S. Kroger (1906–1995), psychiatrist and authority on hypnotism, hypnotherapy, and psychosomatic medicine

Fictional 
 Charles Kroger, a character in the police TV drama Monk

See also

References

German-language surnames
Occupational surnames